Skúlason is a surname of Icelandic origin, meaning son of Skúli. In Icelandic names, the name is not strictly a surname, but is a patronymic. The name may refer to:

Ari Freyr Skúlason (born 1987), Icelandic professional football player
Einarr Skúlason (fl. 12th century), Icelandic priest and skald
Ólafur Ingi Skúlason (born 1983), Icelandic professional football player
Páll Skúlason (born 1945), Icelandic professor of philosophy; rector of the University of Iceland

References

Icelandic-language surnames